Natarajan Somasundaram (11 May 1937 – 14 November 1997), also known as, N. V. N. Somu, was an Indian politician, former Minister of State for Defence & Member of Parliament elected from Tamil Nadu. He was elected to the Lok Sabha as a Dravida Munnetra Kazhagam (DMK) candidate from North Chennai constituency in 1984 and 1996 elections.

Somu, who was the son of DMK leader N. V. Natarajan and married with a son and daughter, died in a helicopter crash while on central government business as Minister of State for Defence on 14 November 1997. His daughter, Kanimozhi NVN Somu, is also a politician with the DMK.

References 

1937 births
1997 deaths
Dravida Munnetra Kazhagam politicians
Union Ministers from Tamil Nadu
Lok Sabha members from Tamil Nadu
India MPs 1984–1989
India MPs 1996–1997